Chul Hyun Ahn is a South Korean artist who works primarily with light.

Description

Ahn is a member of a group of young light artists including Olafur Eliasson, Ivan Navarro, Spencer Finch, and Leo Villareal. Ahn creates meditations on zen notions of the infinite and the void, which distinguishes Ahn's oeuvre from other artists working with light. Ahn's multiple on-going sculpture series including "Forked Series" and "Tunnel Series" systematically explore the limitations of space and optics.

Hilarie M. Sheets, contributing editor of ARTnews who also writes regularly for The New York Times, Art in America, and Art + Auction, said his work is "At once thrilling and ominous, it suggests a rabbit hole to another world—underwater, outer space, afterlife—or journey to the unknown, the kind of leap of faith involved in the artist’s own passage to an unfamiliar country and language." As a pillar in the resurgence of light art, "Ahn creates sculptures utilizing light, color and illusion as physical representations of his investigation of infinite space."

Ahn lives and works in Baltimore, Maryland, where he is represented by C. Grimaldis Gallery.

Biography 
Chul Hyun Ahn was born in Busan, South Korea. He received a Bachelor of Fine Arts from the Chugye University for the Arts in Seoul. In 1997 he moved to the United States and received a Master of Fine Arts from the Mount Royal School at the Maryland Institute College of Art in Baltimore in 2002.

Mr. Grimaldis first saw Ahn's work at his 2002 MFA thesis exhibition at the Maryland Institute College of Art. Soon after, he had his first exhibition with C. Grimaldis Gallery in the winter of 2003 in a solo exhibition titled Infinity - Emptiness which featured six light sculptures. Since 2003 Chul Hyun Ahn has exhibited extensively nationally and internationally, and his work can be found in numerous important private and public collections.

In a review of Ahn's 2008 C. Grimaldis Gallery solo exhibition, Phenomena: Visual Echo art critic Cara Ober wrote: "What does infinity look like? Chul Hyun Ahn's show of thirteen mirrored light boxes (all 2008) answered this question over and over, in subtly different ways. The constructions of plywood and fluorescent light with exposed electrical cords unavoidably recall Donald Judd and Dan Flavin, but Ahn uses these industrial materials to a different end. Rather than clarifying visual phenomena without artifice, Ahn seeks to mystify."

Selected exhibitions 
2011
 C. Grimaldis Gallery, Baltimore, Maryland, Illuminated Void (solo)
 Galerie Paris-Beijing, Paris, France, Visual Echo (solo)
 Kunstraum: Morgenstrabe, Karlsruhe, Germany, Touching The Void
 Delaware Art Museum, Wilmington, Delaware, Perception/Deception: Illusion In Contemporary Art 

2010
 Southeastern Center for Contemporary Art, Winston-Salem, North Carolina, Look Again, Curator: Steven Matijcio

2009
 C. Grimaldis Gallery, Baltimore, Maryland,  A Sculpture Show

2008
 Samuel P. Harn Museum of Art, University of Florida, Gainesville, Florida, Momentum: Contemporary Art From The Harn Collection
 C. Grimaldis Gallery, Baltimore, Maryland, Phenomena: Visual Echo (solo)

2007
 C. Grimaldis Gallery, Baltimore, Maryland, New Work (solo)
 Decker Gallery, Maryland Institute College of Art, Baltimore, Maryland, Jane & Walter Sondheim Semi-Finalist Exhibition

2006
 CPS Gallery, New York, New York
 School 33, Baltimore, Maryland, Biennial Exhibition

2005
 C. Grimaldis Gallery, Baltimore, Maryland, Visual Echoes (solo)
 Conner Contemporary, Washington, D.C., New Work (solo)
 The Shore Institute of the Contemporary Arts, Long Branch, New Jersey, Luminous Recurrence

2004
 C. Grimaldis Gallery, Baltimore, Maryland, Infinite Directions (solo)

2003
C. Grimaldis Gallery, Baltimore, Maryland, Infinity - Emptiness  (solo)

2002
 Conner Contemporary, Washington, D.C., Academy 2002
 CAA Conference, Philadelphia, Pennsylvania, Six Degrees In Cold Storage

2001
 Gallery Four, Baltimore, Maryland, Multiplicity

1999
 Creole Gallery, Lansing, Michigan

1996
 Kyung-In Art Museum, Seoul, South Korea, New Frontier Exhibition
 City Museum of Art, Seoul, South Korea, The Joong-Ang Biennale
 National Museum of Contemporary Art, Seoul, South Korea, The 15th Grand Art Exhibition of Korea

Selected collections 
 American Society of Nephrology, Washington, DC
 Baltimore Office of Promotion and the Arts, Baltimore, Maryland
 Borusan Contemporary, Istanbul, Turkey
 Delaware Art Museum, Wilmington, Delaware
 Hearst Foundation Collection, New York, New York
 Marguiles Collection at the Warehouse, Miami, Florida
 Marvin and Elayne Mordes Collection, West Palm Beach, Florida
 McDonald's Corporation, Washington, DC
 Jordon D. Schnitzer Family Foundation, Portland, Oregon
 Palm Springs Art Museum, Palm Springs, California
 Samuel P. Harn Museum of Art, University of Florida, Gainesville, Florida
 Washington D.C. Convention Center, Washington, DC
 Carre de Malberg Private Collection, Paris, France

References

Suggested reading 
 Adams, Virginia k., & Sheets, Hilarie M., "Chul Hyun Ahn: Illuminated Void" (Baltimore, C. Grimaldis Gallery, 2011).

External links 
 Chul Hyun Ahn on the C. Grimaldis Gallery website
Chul Hyun Ahn on Artnet website

South Korean artists
Contemporary sculptors
Conceptual artists
American installation artists
Light artists
Living people
1971 births